Miguel Ángel Bustillo Lafoz (9 September 1946 – 3 September 2016) was a Spanish footballer who represented Real Zaragoza, Barcelona and CD Málaga. He was capped five times by the Spain national football team between 1968 and 1969, scoring twice.

Club career
Bustillo started his career with the reserve side of Real Zaragoza, Deportivo Aragón. He spent time on loan at UD Mahón, before joining Barcelona in 1969. His first league game for Barcelona would come in El Clásico, against Real Madrid. Having scored two goals, he was seriously injured in a challenge by Pedro de Felipe, suffering a break in both the superficial and deep layers of the internal lateral ligament, damage to the inner meniscus and a rupture to his anterior cruciate ligament. He never fully recovered from this injury, and would make only two more league appearances for Barcelona, before leaving to join CD Málaga in 1972.

Death
Bustillo died on 3 September 2016.

Career statistics

Club

Notes

International

International goals
Scores and results list Norway's goal tally first.

References

1946 births
2016 deaths
Footballers from Zaragoza
Spanish footballers
Spain international footballers
Association football forwards
La Liga players
Segunda División players
Real Zaragoza players
Real Zaragoza B players
FC Barcelona players
CD Málaga footballers